Len and Company is a 2015 American independent comedy-drama film, written and directed by Tim Godsall and Katie Knight. The film stars Rhys Ifans, Juno Temple, Jack Kilmer, Keir Gilchrist, and Kathryn Hahn. The film had its world premiere on June 20, 2015, at the Edinburgh Film Festival.   The film was released on June 10, 2016, by IFC Films.

Plot
A withdrawn music producer's life is disrupted when his son and his protege come to his house unannounced and unexpectedly.

Cast

 Rhys Ifans as Len
 Juno Temple as Zoe
 Jack Kilmer as Max
 Keir Gilchrist as William
 Kathryn Hahn as Isabelle
 Elias Toufexis as Robert
 Tyler Hynes as Paul
 Jonathan Potts as August
 Mark O'Brien as Zach
 Peter Outerbridge as Frank Coulter
 Dale Whibley as Derek Coulter
 Chris Young as Jose
 Jenny Raven as Kelly
 Dennis Long as Craig
 Billy Morrison as Award Presenter
 Lovell Adams-Gray as Chad

Production
In April 2014, Jack Kilmer and Juno Temple had been cast in the film, with Tim Godsall directing the film. In November 2014, it was revealed that Kathryn Hahn, Rhys Ifans, Keir Gilchrist had also been cast in the film. with Youree Henley, Rick Jarjoura, serving as producers, Steve Golin and Kate Buckley serving as executive producers.

Release
The film had its world premiere on June 20, 2015, at the Edinburgh Film Festival. The film then had its North American premiere at the Special Presentations section of the 2015 Toronto International Film Festival. The film was released in a limited release and through video on demand on June 10, 2016.

Critical reception
Len and Company received positive reviews from film critics. It holds a 70% approval rating on review aggregator website Rotten Tomatoes, based on 10 reviews, with an average rating of 6.13/10. On Metacritic, the film holds a rating of 60 out of 100, based on 7 critics, indicating "mixed or average reviews".

Guy Lodge of Variety gave the film a positive review writing : "It’s a spiny, sometimes edgily funny turn, making few concessions to sentimentality even as the role inches toward paternal redemption. Ifans may not succeed in making auds entirely care for Len, but he’s never dull to watch."

References

External links
 
 
 

2015 films
American comedy-drama films
American independent films
2010s English-language films
2010s American films
2015 comedy-drama films
2015 independent films
English-language comedy-drama films